Selwyn Lake is a lake that straddles the border between the Northwest Territories and Saskatchewan, Canada.

See also
List of lakes in the Northwest Territories
List of lakes of Saskatchewan

References

Statistics Canada
Anglersatlas.com

Lakes of the Northwest Territories
Lakes of Saskatchewan